Party Girl or Party Girls may refer to:

Film and TV
 Party Girl (1930 film), starring Marie Prevost
 Party Girl (1958 film), starring Robert Taylor and Cyd Charisse
 Party Girl (1995 film), starring Parker Posey
 Party Girl (2014 film), a 2014 French film
 Party Girl (1996 TV series), short-lived series based on the 1995 film and starring Christine Taylor
 Party Girl (2005 TV series), party planning series on Discovery Home
"Party Girl", episode of 1990s sitcom Brotherly Love (1995 TV series)

Songs
 "Party Girl" (Girlband song)
 "Party Girl" (Grace Jones song)
 "Party Girl" (McFly song)
 "Party Girl" (U2 song)
 "Party Girl" (StaySolidRocky song)
 "Party Girl", a Bernadette Carroll single produced and co-written by Ernie Maresca
 "Party Girl", a song from Elvis Costello and the Attractions' album Armed Forces
 A cover of the above song featured on Linda Ronstadt's Mad Love
 "Party Girl", a song written by Buddy Buie and released as a single by Tommy Roe in 1964
 "Party Girl", a song by Asher Roth 
"Party Girls", a 2014 song by Ludacris.
"Party Girls", Mink DeVille from album Cabretta 
"Party Girls", song by Swazy Styles featuring Qwote 2010
"Party Girls", single by Ya Boy featuring Rico Love from Rich Rocka

Other uses
Party Girl (yacht), a 2012 yacht
Party Girl, a 2007 novel by sex columnist Anna David (journalist)